Kemayoran Airport  also spelled Kemajoran Airport, was the principal airport for Jakarta, Indonesia, from 8 July 1940 until 31 March 1985, when it was replaced by Soekarno–Hatta International Airport.

During World War II it was used by the Royal Air Force and became RAF Kemajoran.  They used it during the invasion by the Japanese.
Starting operation in 1985, Soekarno-Hatta airport replaced Kemayoran airport in Central Jakarta and Halim Perdanakusuma airport in East Jakarta. Kemayoran Airport replaced Jakarta's first airport at Cililitan. What was Kemayoran Airport is now located in two subdistricts: the southern part is located in the Kemayoran Subdistrict, (Central Jakarta) and the northern part is in Pademangan Subdistrict, (North Jakarta).

Douglas DC-8 jetliners flown by Garuda Indonesia, KLM, Japan Airlines, UTA French Airlines, Air Ceylon and Thai Airways operated to Kemayoran in the 1960s and early 1970s, as did Cathay Pacific Convair 880 jets.  Paris-based Transports Aeriens Intercontinentaux formerly served Kemayoran with DC-8s prior to being merged into UTA. Garuda Indonesia also flew Convair 990 and Douglas DC-9 jets as well as Fokker F27 turboprops into the airport at this time. Boeing 707 jetliners operated by Air India, Malaysia-Singapore Airlines, Pan Am and Qantas served Kemayoran as well.

In 1975, international flights were temporarily moved to Halim Perdanakusuma Air Force Base.

Flight operations terminated on the night of 31 March 1985, and domestic flights were immediately transferred to Soekarno-Hatta Airport. The airport was briefly reactivated for the Indonesian Air Show in 1986.

The location of the former airport has been a favorite subject in urban planning, on which the former runways have been converted into a wide boulevard, while the green areas around has been filled gradually into developments such as Jakarta International Exposition Center (JIExpo) and Kotabaru Kemayoran Bandar Kemayoran. Several expansion projects have been abandoned however, due to the 1997 Asian financial crisis like Jakarta Tower and Pallazo Apartement.

The remains of the control tower and main terminal still stands south of the JIExpo site, with a portion of the airport tarmac remaining in front of the terminal, as is the terminal's forecourt. Plans were in consideration to convert the former main terminal into a government office; this plan was apparently abandoned after 2003, as construction progress has stopped. The current government office stands next to the terminal. The site of the former control tower was once set for a residential property, with the tower itself torn down, but due to the 1997–98 financial crisis, has been largely abandoned.

History

Era of the Dutch East Indies Government 

Long before the airport was established, the area of Kemayoran was a land owned by the Commander VOC, Isaac de l'Ostal de Saint-Martin (1629– 1696). Around the end of the 17th century, Issac owned land in Java which included the Kemayoran area, Ancol, Krukut, and Cinere. The name "Mayoran" first appeared in 1816 in the Java Government Gazette ad as "land located near Weltevreden, Batavia". After that, the area was known as "Kemayoran". Until the beginning of the 20th century, the Kemayoran area was still swamp, areal rice fields, as well as residential areas. Then in 1934, the Dutch East Indies Government established an airport in the area and was inaugurated on 8 July 1940. Making Kemayoran as the first International Airport in Indonesia. This airport management by the government Dutch East Indies was entrusted to Koninklijke Nederlandsch-Indische Luchtvaart Maatschappij until the occupation of Japan.

Two days before the inauguration (6 July 1940), the first aircraft to land was the Douglas DC-3 belonging to the KNILM which was flown from Tjililitan Field. Similar aircraft, namely DC-3 registered with PK-AJW are also the first to depart from Kemayoran to Australia, a day later.

On the day of the inauguration, the KNILM held several of its aircraft, including:
 Douglas DC-2 Uiver
 Douglas DC-3 Dakota
 Fokker F.VIIb 3m
 Grumman G-21 Goose
 de Havilland DH-89 Dragon Rapide
 Lockheed L-14 Super Electra.

Only about two months later the KNILM brought in new aircraft, such as:
 Douglas DC-5
  Sikorsky S-43 Baby Clipper.
The first Aerospace Exhibition was also held at Kemayoran, which coincided with the birthday of Queen Wilhelmina on 31 August 1940. In addition to the aircraft belonging to the KNILM, a number of private planes which took shelter in Aeroclub in Batavia participated in enlivening them. These planes include:
 Bücker Bü 131 Jungmann
de Havilland DH-82 Tigermoth
Piper J-3 Cub
Walraven 2 who had flown Batavia – Amsterdam on 27 September 1935.
At that time, war broke out in the Asia Pacific which began to rage. Kemayoran is used for flight military aircraft, although commercial flight activities continue. Military aircraft that had stopped by include:
 Martin B-10
Martin B-12
 Koolhoven F.K.51
 Brewster F2A Buffalo
 Lockheed L-18 Lodestar
 Curtiss P-36 Hawk
 Fokker C.X
 Boeing B-17 Flying Fortress.

When the war became increasingly fierce, Kemayoran did not escape the attacks of attack aircraft belonging to the Air Force Japanese Empire. In February 1942, two DC-5s, two Brewster and an F.VII were hit by a Japanese attack, forcing the KNILM to evacuate its aircraft to Australia and finally Kemayoran was successfully occupied by the Imperial Air Force Japan.

The Age of Japanese Imperial Government 

In March 1942, the airport was taken over by the Japanese Empire. Japanese-made planes that have stopped at Kemayoran include:
 Mitsubishi A6M Zero
 Showa/Nakajima L2D
 Nakajima Ki-43 Hayabusa
 Tachikawa Ki-9
 Tachikawa Ki-36

The Age of Indonesian War of Independence 
After the events of Hiroshima and Nagasaki which forced Japan to surrender to the Allies in August 1945, the Airport was immediately taken over by the Allies and Netherlands Indies Civil Administration because at that time the government Indonesia was located in Yogyakarta Then Kemayoran began to be occupied by Allied aircraft such as:
 Supermarine Spitfire
 North American B-25 Mitchell
 North American P-51 Mustang.

In addition, passenger planes also arrived, including:
 Douglas DC-4
 C-54 Skymaster
 Douglas DC-6
 Boeing 377 Stratocruiser
 Lockheed Constellation

On 1 August 1947, Kemayoran International Airport witnessed the birth of the KLM Interinsulair Bedrijf airline which was later nationalized to become the first national airline in Indonesia, namely Garuda Indonesian Airways

Indonesian Government Era 

In the 1950s after the independence war, the management of civil aviation and airports was immediately carried out by the Indonesian government. It was only in 1958 that it was managed by Civil Aviation Office, which is now known as Directorate General of Civil Aviation.

On 20 February 1964 the management of Kemayoran was handed over to Perusahaan Negara Angkasa Pura Kemajoran, a state-owned enterprise which eventually becomes Angkasa Pura I. For this, the government invested Rp. 15 million in Rupiah at that time. Furthermore, the government increased capital by diverting terminal buildings, other supporting buildings, runways, taxiways, aprons, hangars and operational equipment. Until the end of operations in 1985 management was carried out by Angkasa Pura I.

Kemayoran International Airport experienced a period of historic phases of Indonesia from the reign of the Dutch East Indies, Japanese occupation to Indonesian independence (Old Order, and New Order), especially in the aviation world. From civilian planes to military aircraft, from the start of their development to piston engines, propellers to turbojets landed here. For example, a Fokker type aircraft was recorded from the Fokker F-VIIb-3 with a piston engine, Fokker Friendship with a turbo engine until the Fokker F-28 jet engine landed here. Then the Douglas DC-3 aircraft recorded landed and flew from the beginning and end of the airport's operation. And the presence of early generation wide-body aircraft such as the Airbus A-300 and McDonnell Douglas DC-10.

In addition, several dark events also colored the airport's operations. Among other things, the Beechcraft plane which crashed while landing, then Convair 340 which landed without wheels, a DC-3 Dakota plane that caught fire and a Douglas DC-9 aircraft that suffered a broken body when landing on the runway. Then the Fokker F-27 aircraft which took off swooped and turned down until it burned to the ground in a training flight. Also recorded were planes that never returned after taking off from Kemayoran.

Kemayoran became busy in the 1970s, so the government temporarily moved international flights to Halim Perdanakusuma Airport on 10 January 1974. But all domestic flights still survive at Kemayoran. Kemayoran's busy life at that time was only matched by Sultan Aji Muhammad Sulaiman Airport in Balikpapan, which at that time was busy in mining, oil and timber activities.

Transfer of location and closure of airport 

Towards the mid-1970s, Kemayoran was considered too close to the Indonesian military base, Halim Perdanakusuma Airport. Civil flights in the area are narrow, while air traffic is increasing rapidly, threatening international traffic. That was then the government planned to move this airport activity to the new airport. With the help of USAID, Cengkareng was chosen as the location of the new Airport.

In accordance with the inauguration of the Soekarno-Hatta International Airport, Kemayoran International Airport slowly began to close and until it finally officially ceased operations on 31 March 1985 precisely at 00:00 WIB. At that time all passengers who had boarded at Kemayoran were immediately taken by bus to Soekarno-Hatta because all flights from Kemayoran have been transferred to the airport.

In popular culture
Kemayoran Airport is the setting for the beginning of The Adventures of Tintin comic, Flight 714 to Sydney, by Hergé. Tintin and his friends, Captain Haddock, Professor Calculus, and Snowy, transit there for refueling stop on the way to Sydney, Australia.

Former airlines and destinations

Passenger

Cargo

Accidents and incidents

 23 November 1945: a Douglas DC-3 Royal Air Force with registration KG520 crashes at Kemayoran Airport. The Dakota belly landed following an engine failure. The occupants were murdered by Indonesians. Killing 26 people on board.
 5 April 1972 : a Merpati Nusantara Vickers Viscount, take off from Jakarta, was the subject of an attempted hijacking. The hijacker was killed.
 26 September 1972: Garuda Indonesia Fokker F-27 PK-GFP crashed at takeoff. Having reached an altitude of 30 m after taking off from runway 35, the aircraft banked to the right and crashed 90 m to the right of the centerline. The aircraft had accumulated 2095 flying hours and 1478 cycles. Killing 3 people on board.
 7 September 1974: Garuda Indonesia Fokker F-27 PK-GFJ departing from Kemayoran Airport, collision with a building on landing in bad weather at Bandar Lampung. Killing 30 people on board.
 24 September 1975: Garuda Indonesia Flight 150 crashed on approach to Palembang Airport. The accident, which was attributed to poor weather and fog, killed 25 out of 61 passengers and one person on the ground.
 20 March 1982: a Garuda Indonesia Fokker F-28 on a domestic flight overran the runway at Tanjung Karang-Branti Airport in bad weather. The aircraft subsequently burst into flames killing all 27 people on board.

Gallery

Notes

References

Cited works

Defunct airports in Indonesia
Airports in Jakarta
Airports established in 1940
Airports disestablished in 1985